"Brick by Brick" is a song by Arctic Monkeys from the band's fourth album Suck It and See. The song was the first track to be revealed from the album, on 4 March 2011, and was designed as a teaser for the album rather than a lead single. The lead single was instead "Don't Sit Down 'Cause I've Moved Your Chair" which was released digitally on 12 April. A limited-edition white-label seven-inch vinyl version of "Don't Sit Down 'Cause I've Moved Your Chair" released on 16 April featured "Brick by Brick" as its B-side.

Alex Turner explained the story of the song to NME: 

The song is intentionally brief and humorous, with Turner claiming that it was meant to include fewer than 30 words, "since we always do songs with a thousand words", an approach borrowed from Iggy Pop. "Even though it is dumbed down, we know it, and it's got a sense of humor … (t)here have always been jokes all over our songs; I originally started writing lyrics to make my friends crack a smile, which is difficult."

Music video 
Despite not being a single, the song still has a music video. The video features a girl taking a 10-inch Arctic Monkeys gramophone record out of its sleeve and playing it on her gramophone whilst smoking a cigarette. About halfway through the song, the scene switches to a car driving through California at sunset and footage of the band on a beach. As the song reaches its final chorus, the scene changes again to footage of the band recording the song at Sunset Sound Recorders in Hollywood. As the song reaches its close, the video cuts back to the girl listening to the record and fades to black as she walks away. The print on the vinyl played in the video is of the Sheffield coat of arms.

Personnel
Matt Helders – lead and backing vocals, drums
Alex Turner – lead guitar, lead and backing vocals
Jamie Cook – rhythm guitar
Nick O'Malley – bass guitar, backing vocals

References

External links

2011 songs
Arctic Monkeys songs
Songs written by Alex Turner (musician)
Song recordings produced by James Ford (musician)
Songs written by Matt Helders